
Gmina Białogard is a rural gmina (administrative district) in Białogard County, West Pomeranian Voivodeship, in north-western Poland. Its seat is the town of Białogard, although the town is not part of the territory of the gmina.

Villages
Gmina Białogard contains the villages and settlements of Białogórzynko, Białogórzyno, Buczek, Byszyno, Czarnowęsy, Dargikowo, Dębczyno, Góry, Gruszewo, Kamosowo, Klępino Białogardzkie, Kościernica, Laski, Łęczenko, Łęczno, Łęczynko, Leśniki, Liskowo, Lulewice, Lulewiczki, Moczyłki, Nasutowo, Nawino, Nosówko, Pękaninko, Pękanino, Podwilcze, Pomianowo, Przegonia, Pustkówko, Pustkowo, Rarwino, Redlino, Rogowo, Rościno, Rychówko, Rychowo, Rzyszczewo, Sińce, Stajkowo, Stanomino, Strzelec, Tarpnowo, Trzebiec, Trzebiele, Wronie Gniazdo, Wygoda, Żabiniec, Ząbki, Zagórze, Zaspy Małe, Żeleźno, Żelimucha and Żytelkowo.

Neighbouring gminas
Gmina Białogard is bordered by the town of Białogard and by the gminas of Biesiekierz, Karlino, Połczyn-Zdrój, Rąbino, Sławoborze, Świeszyno and Tychowo.

References
Polish official population figures 2006

Bialogard
Białogard County